Perko Kolevski (27 December 1944 – 17 December 2021) was a Macedonian doctor and politician. He served as the Minister of Health from 1991 to 1992.

References

1944 births
2021 deaths
Macedonian politicians
Macedonian physicians
Health ministers of North Macedonia
People from Probištip Municipality